The International Philatelic Libraries Association (IPLA) was formed in 1996 at the Capex 96 stamp exhibition in Toronto.

Delegates from many countries attended including Virginia Horn from the American Philatelic Research Library and David Beech, Curator of the British Library Philatelic Collection. The library of the Royal Philatelic Society London is also a member.

See also 
List of philatelic libraries
 Philatelic literature

References

External links

Philatelic libraries
Philatelic organizations
International organisations based in the United Kingdom
Organizations established in 1996